The South Westphalia University of Applied Sciences [German : Fachhochschule Südwestfalen] is a high-ranked research institution located in the state of North Rhine-Westphalia, Germany. With more than 14,000 students, it is one of the largest of its kind in North Rhine-Westphalia. The headquarters and one of its four campuses are in Iserlohn. It has three more campuses located in Hagen, Meschede and Soest and a subsidiary in Lüdenscheid.

It offers a total of about 52 bachelor and master courses in the fields of Engineering, Natural Sciences, Information Technology, Business management and Agriculture.
It offers courses for both full-time students and for those in employment. It also accommodates those who wish to combine vocational training with studies.

History 

The oldest forerunner of the university was the trade school in Hagen, founded by the Prussian reform politician Beuth on 1 December 1824, for the qualification for the Berlin Royal Technical Institute, which later became the State Engineering School for Mechanical Engineering and Electrical Engineering, and then the Märkische Fachhochschule, based in Iserlohn and the two locations Iserlohn and Hagen.

The Fachhochschule was founded on January 1, 2002, when the entire university education was disbanded in North Rhine-Westphalia and the Märkische Fachhochschule with the Fachhochschulabschaltungen Meschede and Soest of the former Gesamthochschule Paderborn was united as an equal partner. Seat of the Fachhochschule is Iserlohn.

The founding rector was Michael Teusner from 1 January 2002 to 31 August 2004. From 1 September 2004 to the end of 2008 Jörg Liese was rector of the university. On 9 December 2008 Claus Schuster was elected as the first president of the University of Applied Sciences Südwestfalen by the University Council, confirmed by the Senate of the university. After a reform by the Senate, the university management was renamed the Rectorate and Claus Schuster was elected Rector of the university on 9 December 2014.

Timeline 

The Fachhochschule Südwestfalen and its predecessors

Campus 

The South Westphalia University of Applied Sciences has four campuses located in  Iserlohn (seat), Hagen, Meschede and Soest and a subsidiary in Lüdenscheid. The university strongly believes in small classes and personal support. The university is known for its student friendly environment.

Research 

Main areas of research include

 Aluminum Technology
 Applied Digital Image Processing                                                                         
 Automation of Metalworking Processes in the Automotive Industry
 Soil Ecology / Soil Protection 
 Computational Intelligence and Cognitive Systems
 Decentralized Power Supply
 Digital Audio Broadcasting
 Digital Signal Processing
 Finite Field Calculations
 Fuzzy Technology
 Gerontotechnology
 Integrated Supply Chain Management
 Corrosion Protection / Surface Technology
 Plastic technology
 Lightweight Construction and Aluminum Technology
 Life Science Analytics
 Mechatronics
 Nanoscale Materials 
 New Lighting Technologies
 New Technologies for Electrical Power Generation 
 Reduction of Pollutant Emissions
 Sensors / Actuators
 Chipless Production Processes and Production Design
 System Engineering and Management
 Forming Technology
 Environmentally Compatible Production Automation
 Environmentally Compatible and Appropriate Agriculture / Sustainable Agriculture
 Comparative City Marketing Research
 Water Management / Environmental Engineering

References

External links 

 University Website

Universities of Applied Sciences in Germany
Universities and colleges in North Rhine-Westphalia